Kim Yeon-chul (born 26 March 1964) is a South Korean associate professor of unification at Inje University who served as Minister of Unification under President Moon Jae-in from April 2019 to June 2020.

Before promoted to Minister, Kim was the president of the Korea Institute for National Unification, a government-funded research institute. He was previously a policy advisor to then-Minister of Unification Chung Dong-young from 2004 to 2006.

After completing his doctorate programme, he joined Samsung Economic Research Institute as its senior researcher. He was also the first president of The Hankyoreh's research institute on peace studies.

Kim holds three degrees in political science from Sungkyunkwan University from a bachelor to a doctorate.

Following North Korea's destruction of its Kaesong liaison office and a general worsening of inter-Korean relations, he offered to resign on June 17, 2020. On June 19, 2020, President Moon Jae-in officially accepted his resignation as the Minister of Unification.

References 

Sungkyunkwan University alumni
Living people
1964 births
People from Donghae City
Government ministers of South Korea
Experts on North Korea
Academic staff of Inje University